Dolores Ruiz de Assin Jorda (born 16 April 1964) is a Spanish team handball player who played for the club Ent. Pegaso and for the Spanish national team. She was born in Madrid. She competed at the 1992 Summer Olympics in Barcelona, where the Spanish team placed seventh.

She was retired because of her problems in her knee. Nowadays, she is a physical education teacher in a Spanish high school (IES Antares).

References

1964 births
Living people
Sportspeople from Madrid
Spanish female handball players
Olympic handball players of Spain
Handball players at the 1992 Summer Olympics
Handball players from the Community of Madrid
20th-century Spanish women